Rafael Aranda Roco, Jr. (born November 20, 1953),  popularly known as Bembol Roco, is a Filipino actor  whose work ranges from films to television. He is famous for his critically acclaimed role as Julio Madiaga in Maynila: Sa mga Kuko ng Liwanag ("Manila in the Claws of Light"). Though he acts in his country's films, he also had an important role in the 1982 Australian-U.S. film The Year of Living Dangerously. He also portrayed  villain roles in  Philippine action movies due to his signature bald head as well as various supporting roles.
Bem starred in Sine Novela: Tinik sa Dibdib.

He has twin sons named Felix and Dominic.

He is well known to be most collaborative works with the late Lino Brocka, where he is a part of a group of actors called "Brocka babies", and directors such as Ishmael Bernal, Chito S. Roño, Marilou Diaz-Abaya, and Joel Lamangan in the late twentieth century.

Filmography

Television

Film
Boy Kodyak (1970) - Detective Teo Rosa
Tatlo, dalawa, isa (1974) - Rocky
Maynila, Sa Mga kuko ng liwanag (1975) - Julio Madiaga
Sakada (1976) - youth activist David
Tatlong Taong Walang Diyos (1976) - USAFEE fighter Crispin
Lunes, Martes, Miyerkules, Huwebes, Biyernes, Sabado, Linggo (1976)
Itim (1976)
Hubad na bayani (1977)
Tisoy! (1977) - Julio Madiaga
Babae, huwag kang tukso (1977)
Sa piling ng mga sugapa (1977)
Banta ng kahapon (1977)
Boy Pana (Terror ng Maynila '63) (1978) - Boy Pana
Pagputi ng uwak, pag-itim ng tagak (1978)
Lagi na lamang ba akong babae? (1978) - Eric
Hayop sa hayop (1978)
Kid Kaliwete (1978) - Kid Kaliwete
Isa ... Dalawa ... Tatlo ... Ang tatay kong kalbo (1979)
Midnight Show (1979)
Ang Leon, ang Tigre, at ang Alamid (1979)
Kanto Boy (1980) - Kanto Boy
Gabi ng lagim ngayon (1980) - Abel
Pinay, American Style (1980) - Nonoy
Beach House (1980)
Pangkat Do or Die (1980)
Alyas Boy Kalbo 1980
Taga sa panahon (1980)
Intrusion: Cambodia (1981)
Bulldog (1981)
Pabling (1981)
Totoy Guwapo (1981)
Asal Hayop (1981)
Cinq et la peau (1982) - Bembol
Tres Kantos (1982)
The Year of Living Dangerously (1982) - Kumar
Over My Dead Body (1983)
Minsan, may isang ina (1983)
'Merika (1984) - Mon
Bagets (1984) - Buko Vendor
Halang Ang Kaluluwa 1985
Gabi na, kumander (1986)
Teritoryo ko ito (1986)
Alamat ng ninja kuno (1986)
Top Mission (1987)
Tatlong ina, isang anak (1987)
Tirtir Gang 1988
Orapronobis (1989) - Kumander Kontra
Babangon ako't dudurugin kita (1989) - Rod
Anak ni Baby Ama (1990) - Junior Bahala (Released Date: 26 September 1990)
Urbanito Dizon (1990) - Pol
Biokids (1990)
Gumapang Ka sa Lusak (1990) - Falcon
Hindi Kita Iiwanang Buhay: Kapitan Paile (1990) - Sgt. Dalisay (Released Date: 20 November 1990)
Lover's Delight (1990)
Kidlat ng Maynila: Joe Pring 2 (1991) - Buwang
Kalaban Mortal ni Baby Ama 1991
Eddie Tagalog: Pulis Makati (1992)
Kanto Boy: Alyas Kanto Boy (1992) - Morris/Shiny (Released Date: 28 October 1992)
Patayin si Billy Zapanta (1992) - Patrolman Martin (Date of Released: 10 December 1992)
Parolado: Partners in Crime (1993) - Enrico Silvano
Sana'y Ikaw na nga (1993)
Talahib at rosas (1994) - Kumander Baliling
Wating (1994) - Bert
Nagkataon ... Nagkatagpo (1994) - Guzman
Pulis Patola 2 (1995)
Ikaw pa ... Eh love Kita (1995) - Benjie
Asero (1995) - Spade
Matimbang pa sa dugo (1995) - Sabater
Iligpit si Bobby Ortega: Markang Bungo 2 (1995) - Martin
Humanda ka babalikan kita (1996)
Tubusin mo ng bala ang puso ko (1996)
Detective: Michael & Jackson (1996) - Steven Founders
Wala nang iibigin pang iba (1997) - Rufo
Ipaglaban Mo II: The Movie (1997) - Sgt. Macatulos
Kadre (1997)
Iskalawag (1997)
Anak ng Bulkan (1997) - Pulon
Di Puwedeng Hindi Puwede! (1999) - Mendez
Esperanza: The Movie (1999) - Luis
Bulaklak ng Maynila (1999) - Roque
Palaban (2000) - Barikan
Biyaheng langit (2000) - Bossing
Homecoming (2003) - Mr. Edades
U Belt (2004) - Major
Ang Anak ni Brocka (2005)
Boso (2005) - Tata Nando
The Great Raid (2005) - Henchman #2
Tuli (2005)
Donsol (2006) - Fidel
First Day High (2006) - Investigator Matriponio
Faces of Love (2007)
M.O.N.A.Y (Misteyks obda neyson adres Yata) ni Mr. Shooli (2007)
Pi7ong Tagpo (2007) - Fred Rodriguez
Batanes: Sa Dulo Ng Walang Hanggan (2007) - Boy
Maynila sa mga pangil ng dilim (2008)
U.P.C.A.T. (2008) - Mang Avelino
Kinuluyang Kiti (2009) - Udong
Oh, My Girl! (2009) - Director
Miss You Like Crazy (2010) - Efren Samonte
Pendong (2010) - Mariano Verona
 Amigo (2011) - Policarpio
Dagim (2010) 
Aswang (2011 film) - Moises, king of the Abuwaks
Thy Womb (2012) - Bang-Asan
Boy Golden: Shoot to Kill, the Arturo Porcuna Story 2013

Awards

References

External links
 

1953 births
Living people
Male actors from Metro Manila
ABS-CBN personalities
GMA Network personalities
Filipino people of Spanish descent